Pollie Anne Myers-Pinkins (née Myers; July 14, 1932 – March 17, 2003) was an American civil rights activist, who along with Autherine Lucy, were the first African Americans admitted to the University of Alabama in 1952.

Early life
Pinkins was born on July 14, 1932, to Alice Lamb and Henry Myers. She attended the historically black college of Miles College in Fairfield, Alabama.

Application to the University of Alabama
On September 24, 1952 Hudson, and close friend Autherine Lucy, applied to the University of Alabama without indicating their race and were accepted. The idea had been hatched by Pinkins, who convinced the hesitant Lucy to go along with the plot. Lucy later said, "I thought she was joking at first, I really did." The newspaper, the Birmingham World, which Pinkins worked at, celebrated their admission on the front page. Realizing who the applicants were, the University soon began to backtrack. On October 10, 1955 the Supreme Court ordered the University to admit the two women. Over three years later, the University allowed Lucy to attend on the condition that Pinkins could not. They claimed that Pinkins could not attend the school since she was an unsuitable student due to the fact that she had married after she had become pregnant out of wedlock.

Personal life
Pinkins went on to get a master's degree in education from Wayne State University. Pinkins was married twice. Her second marriage was to Robert Pinkins. She had five children, three sons and two daughters. Myers died in Detroit, Michigan in 2003.

Legacy 
The Black Alumni Association at the University of Alabama gives out a scholarship called the Pollie Anne Myers-Pinkins AAAN Endowed Scholarship in honor of Pinkins every year.

See also

References

1932 births
2003 deaths
Civil rights movement
Miles College alumni
University of Alabama alumni